Abdulsalam Al Ghurbani  (Arabic: عبدالسلام الغرباني  ) (born 1 December 1976) is a Yemeni football Midfield and Club Al-Sha'ab Ibb

International goals

Honours

Club
Al-Sha'ab Ibb

Yemeni League: 2
2003, 2004
Yemeni President Cup: 2
2002, 2003
Yemeni September 26 Cup: 1
2002

See also
List of one-club men

References

External links 
 

1976 births
Living people
Yemeni footballers
Yemen international footballers
Al Sha'ab Ibb players
Yemeni League players
Association football midfielders